Mohamed Zaoui (born May 14, 1960) is a former middleweight boxer from Algeria. He won the bronze medal at the 1984 Summer Olympics in Los Angeles, becoming the first Algerian to ever win a medal at the Olympic Games.

Personal
Zaoui was born in the village of Zaouiet Yagoubi, near Nedroma, in the Tlemcen Province. When he was just five months old, he emigrated with his family to Évin-Malmaison, France.

Career
Zaoui won the bronze medal in the Middleweight division (71–75 kg) at the 1984 Summer Olympics in Los Angeles. He shared the podium with Puerto Rico's Arístides González.

Career 

  Olympic Games 1984 Los Angeles, USA (75 kg)
 Quarter-finals World Cup - Seoul, South Korea 1985 (75 kg)

International tournaments 

  24 Fevrier Tournament - Algiers, Algeria 1985 (75 kg)

References

External links

1960 births
Living people
Middleweight boxers
Boxers at the 1984 Summer Olympics
Olympic boxers of Algeria
Olympic bronze medalists for Algeria
Olympic medalists in boxing
Medalists at the 1984 Summer Olympics
People from Tlemcen Province
Algerian emigrants to France
Algerian male boxers